Gazi Osman Paşa is a neighborhood in Çerkezköy district of Tekirdağ Province, Turkey. At  it is almost merged to Çerkezköy.

References

External links
 Tekirdağ Governor's Official Website
 Metropolitan Municipality of Tekirdağ
 District municipality's Official Website

Populated places in Tekirdağ Province
Towns in Turkey
Çerkezköy District